Margriet Smulders (born 17 July 1955) is a Dutch photographer of floral still lifes. She attended the Radboud University Nijmegen from 1974 to 1983 and the Academy of Arts in Arnhem from 1979 to 1985.

Work
Smulders is best known for her self-portraits and photographs of her family. Her constructed portraits of domestic life were included in the exhibition Who's looking at the Family? at the Barbican Art Gallery, London in 1994. Like Sally Mann, she used her own family in this series. She specializes in portrait photography, mostly portraying family portraits and working people proud in their work and their relationships. She currently lives and works in Nijmegen, the Netherlands.
Her works show influences of Dutch Golden Age painting in their composition, use of light and color, and rendering of textures and surfaces.

To achieve her photographic effects, she utilizes film rather than digital photography. Most of her works are titled mythological figures or dedicated to inspirational painters, enhancing the effect of alienation, while retaining a strong element of eroticism.

Since 1999 when she saw an exhibition on voluptuous Dutch floral still-lives of the seventeenth century at the Rijksmuseum, Amsterdam she has worked on an ongoing series of floral still life photographs. Her photographs of flowers are highly ambivalent. Inspired by the classical arrangements of the seventeenth century still lifes Smulders arranges theaters of flowers on big mirrors, using silk and inks which comment on beauty and decay. The flowers float and appear to be on the edge of disintegration

Publications

Publications by Smulders
Margriet Smulders fotografeert de Katholieke Universiteit in 75 Portretten. Uitgeverij Katholieke Universiteit Nijmegen. With texts by Johan van de Woestijne, Flip Bool and Wim Bronzwaar.
Sirene, Verlangen en verleiding = Siren, Desire and Seduction. Liempde: Kempen, 2002. Text by Pietje Tegenbosch.
Get drunk. Self-published, 2006. With an essay by Robbert Roos and a preface by Danielle Lokin.
Margriet Smulders. D'jonge Hond, 2010. With a preface by Frank van de Schoor and texts by Wouter Kloek, Marina Aarts, Laila Tijabi,  Francis Wells, Marjoleine de Vos, Yvonne Benschop, Prakash Chhangani, Jan Derksen, Ellen Harris, Matthias Harder, Brigitte Lardinois, Matthijs Schouten, and Johan van de Woestijne.
Holy Disorders. With a text by Cornel Bierens.

Publication with contribution by Smulders
What Makes Great Photography: 80 Masterpieces explained. Text by Val Williams. Apple Press, 2012.

External links

1955 births
Living people
Dutch photographers
Dutch women photographers
People from Bussum
Radboud University Nijmegen alumni